In biology, the BBCH-scale for leafy vegetables not forming heads describes the phenological development of leafy vegetables not forming heads, such as spinach, loosehead lettuce, and kale, using the BBCH-scale.

The phenological growth stages and BBCH-identification keys of leafy vegetables not forming heads are:

1. For lettuce varieties without head, spinach and species with rosette-type growth
2. For kale and species without rosette growth

References

External links
 A downloadable version of the BBCH Scales

BBCH-scale